Randle Ranger Station-Work Center in Gifford Pinchot National Forest near Randle, Washington was built during 1935-36 by the Civilian Conservation Corps.  It was listed on the National Register of Historic Places in 1986 for its architecture.  It was designed by the USDA Forest Svce. Architecture Group in Rustic architecture.  The listing included seven contributing buildings including a single dwelling, a secondary structure, a warehouse, and a fire station on a  area.

It included a -story  by  office built in 1935 and a -story  by  shop building built in 1936.  Both of these are of wood-frame construction on poured concrete foundations.  It also included a fire control warehouse, another warehouse, an open vehicle storage shelter, a barn, and a gas and oil storage house built in 1935.

References

External links 

Civilian Conservation Corps in Washington (state)
United States Forest Service ranger stations
Park buildings and structures on the National Register of Historic Places in Washington (state)
Buildings and structures completed in 1935
Buildings and structures in Lewis County, Washington
Rustic architecture in Washington (state)
National Register of Historic Places in Lewis County, Washington
1936 establishments in Washington (state)